Eubranchus odhneri is a species of sea slug or nudibranch, a marine gastropod mollusc in the family Eubranchidae.

Distribution
This species was described from Russia.

References

Eubranchidae
Gastropods described in 1926